Menadon is an extinct genus of traversodontid cynodonts. The type and only species is Menadon besairiei.

Fossils of Menadon were first found in Isalo II (the Makay Formation) of Madagascar, which preserves sediments from the Middle to Late Triassic period. They have also been recovered from the Santa Maria Formation of the Paraná Basin near Santa Cruz do Sul in Rio Grande do Sul, Brazil.

Menadon was unique among non-mammalian synapsids for the presence of hypsodont (high-crowned) postcanine teeth. Hypsodont teeth grow continuously to counteract high wear caused by a diet of abrasive plant material. Menadon's teeth convergently resemble those of hypsodont xenarthrans such as sloths and armadillos, due to their column-like form and dentine which grows from the crown towards the root.

References 

Traversodontids
Prehistoric cynodont genera
Middle Triassic synapsids
Late Triassic synapsids
Carnian genera
Middle Triassic synapsids of Africa
Fossils of Madagascar
Triassic Madagascar
Late Triassic synapsids of South America
Triassic Brazil
Fossils of Brazil
Santa Maria Formation
Fossil taxa described in 2000